Herta Huber (born 24 January 1926 in Schönbach, Czechoslovakia) is a German writer and poet. She is known for writing in the Egerland dialect, originating from what is now part of Bohemia in the Czech Republic. She was awarded several commendations of the Sudetendeutsche Landsmannschaft for her literary contributions. She resides in Immenstadt.

Book Publications
 Stutzala
 Spraal u Spriezl
 Fröiha u heint
 Maria Kulm - Historie (1983)
 ... aber Brennessel wachst schneller (1991)	
 Kinderzeit im Egerland (1999)

References

External links
 

1926 births
Living people
People from Cheb District
Sudeten German people
German poets
Naturalized citizens of Germany
Czechoslovak people of German descent
German women poets